The 2012 Reigate and Banstead Council election took place on 3 May 2012 to elect members of Reigate and Banstead Borough Council in Surrey, England. One third of the council was elected,. The Conservative Party remained in overall control of the council.

Election result
The composition of the council after the election was:
Conservative: 37 (+2)
Reigate and Banstead Residents Association: 7 (0)
Green Party of England and Wales: 3 (+1)
Liberal Democrat: 2 (-1)
Independent: 2 (-2)

Ward results

References

2012 English local elections
2012
2010s in Surrey